Didier Cottaz (born 23 May 1967) is a French former racing driver.

Racing record

Complete International Formula 3000 results
(key) (Races in bold indicate pole position) (Races
in italics indicate fastest lap)

24 Hours of Le Mans results

References

People from Bourgoin-Jallieu
1967 births
Living people
French racing drivers
International Formula 3000 drivers
24 Hours of Le Mans drivers
Sportspeople from Isère

Nismo drivers
Paul Stewart Racing drivers
Pescarolo Sport drivers